The hundred of Braunton was the name of one of thirty two ancient administrative units of Devon, England.

The parishes in the hundred were: 
Ashford; 
Barnstaple; 
Berrynarbor; 
Bittadon; 
Bratton Fleming; 
Braunton; 
Combe Martin; 
East Buckland; 
East Down; 
Filleigh; 
Georgeham; 
Goodleigh; 
Heanton Punchardon; 
Ilfracombe; 
Kentisbury; 
Lundy; 
Marwood; 
Mortehoe; 
Pilton; 
Trentishoe; 
West Buckland and 
West Down.

See also 
 List of hundreds of England and Wales - Devon

References 

Hundreds of Devon